Sir Andrew Thomas Cahn, KCMG (born 1 April 1951) is a non-executive director of Nomura, chair of the board of governors of Birkbeck, University of London, and a former senior civil servant.

Career
In January 2011, Cahn stepped down after five years in charge of UK Trade & Investment, the government department that promotes exports and attracts foreign direct investment. Prime Minister, David Cameron, said: "Andrew has been a wonderful chief executive of UK Trade & Investment and a fantastic ambassador for the UK. He has been central to the Government’s efforts to make Britain an attractive place to invest and to sell Britain to the world." 

After stepping down, Cahn took on a number of non-executive directorships, including Nomura Group, Lloyd's of London and Huawei and pro-bono roles including WWF and the Institute for Government.

Career summary:
2015–Present Non-executive director, Huawei Technologies (UK) and Chair of the Audit and Risk Committees
2012–2018 Non-executive director, Nomura International plc
2012–2019 Non-executive director, General Dynamics UK
2011–2014 chairman Huawei Technologies UK advisory board
2011–2012	vice-chairman (Public Policy), Nomura Group
2011–2019 Franchise Board of Lloyd's of London
2006 – 2011	chief executive officer, UK Trade & Investment
2000 – 2006	Director of Government and Industry Affairs, British Airways
1997 – 2000	Chef de Cabinet (Chief of Staff) to Neil Kinnock, Vice-President of the European Commission
1995 – 1997	Deputy Head of European Secretariat, Cabinet Office
1992 – 1995	Principal Private Secretary to the Rt. Hon. William Waldegrave MP, Chancellor of the Duchy of Lancaster and subsequently Minister of Agriculture, Fisheries and Food
1988 – 1992	Head of Research Policy, Ministry of Agriculture, Fisheries and Food
1984 – 1988	Member of the Cabinet of Lord Cockfield, Vice-President of the European Commission and Commissioner for the Single Market.
1982 – 1984	First Secretary, United Kingdom Representation to the European Communities
1979 – 1982	Ministry of Agriculture, Fisheries and Food
1978 – 1979	Private Secretary to the Permanent Secretary, Ministry of Agriculture, Fisheries and Food
1977 – 1978	UK Representation to the European Economic Community
1973 – 1977	Ministry of Agriculture, Fisheries and Food

Personal life/family
Cahn is the son of one of the founders of Materials Science, Robert W. Cahn FRS.  He was educated at Bedales School and then Trinity College, Cambridge (BA 1st class Hons).

He is married to Virginia Beardshaw, who was Chief Executive of I Can, the children's communications charity; they have one daughter, and two sons.

Affiliations
Cahn is a trustee of the Gatsby Charitable Foundation and a governor and member of the Executive Committee of the Institute for Government. 
And Independent Director of  Huawei Technologies (UK) 

He was previously a trustee of the Arvon Foundation, a member of the Government's Financial Services Trade and Investment Board, Board member of CityUK, Chair of the City of London's International Trade and Investment Group, a member of the Advisory Council of the Rector of the University of the Arts, an Association Member of BUPA and a member of the Governing Board of Business for New Europe. He has also served as trustee of the Royal Botanic Gardens Kew, where he was Chairman of their Audit Committee, and of Japan Society. Cahn was chair of WWF (UK), a member of the global Board of WWF and Chair of the Audit Committee from April 2014 -June 2020. 

He was also formerly a non-executive director at Cadbury Ltd and a Governor of Bedales School.

Honours
Already a Companion of the Order of St Michael and St George (CMG), Cahn was elevated to Knight Commander of the Order of St Michael and St George (KCMG) in the 2009 New Year Honours.

Controversy
Cahn encountered controversy in January 2011, when an internal email he had sent saying the FCO wished to find ways to spend up to its 2010/11 budget ceiling, was leaked to the Daily Mail. In the email, Cahn said: "The FCO is heading for an underspend and wants to get money out of the door."

Footnotes

1951 births
Living people
People educated at Bedales School
Alumni of Trinity College, Cambridge
Civil servants in the Ministry of Agriculture, Fisheries and Food
Private secretaries in the British Civil Service
Civil servants in the Cabinet Office
Civil servants in the Foreign Office
Civil servants in the Department for Business, Innovation and Skills
Knights Commander of the Order of St Michael and St George